Serra do Rio do Rastro (literally Mountain Range of the River of the Track) is a mountain range located in the southeast of the state of Santa Catarina, Southern Brazil. It is crossed by the road SC-390, with remarkable landscapes and deep cliffs.

This mountain range is situated between the municipalities of Lauro Müller and Bom Jardim da Serra, and its highest point is situated at 1,460 metres (4,790 feet) above sea level. In the highest areas of this place, the Atlantic Ocean, located about 100 km (62 mi) away, can be spotted on clear days. Frosts are common and snowfalls can occur in the highest areas.

See also
Morro da Boa Vista
Morro da Igreja
Pedra Furada (Santa Catarina)
Rio do Rasto Formation

External links

  Guide of the municipality of Bom Jardim da Serra

Rio do Rastro